Erlanger may refer to:

 Erlanger (surname), a German surname
 Erlanger, Kentucky, a city in the United States
 Erlanger (crater), a lunar impact crater

See also
 Erlanger program, a mathematical research program proposed by Felix Klein in 1872
 Klaw & Erlanger, a New York City based theatrical production partnership
 Erlanger Health System, a multi-hospital system with five campuses based in Chattanooga, Tennessee